Daleho Irandust (born 4 June 1998) is a Swedish professional footballer who plays as an attacking midfielder for Groningen in the Dutch Eredivisie.

Club career

BK Häcken
Born and raised in Gothenburg, Daleho Irandust won the Gothia Cup in 2016 with the under-19 side of BK Häcken. Irandust made his debut for the senior side of Häcken with a goal and two assists on 24 August 2016 against Växjö in the 2016–17 Svenska Cupen. He made his Allsvenskan debut for Häcken on 9 April 2017 against Djurgården. He scored his first Allsvenskan goal for the club on 5 May 2017 against Sirius, before scoring his second a week later in a 1–0 win at Kalmar. He was nominated for the newcomer of the year award at the end of the 2017 Allsvenskan season with two goals and five assists.

Irandust scored a free kick against Norrby after opening the scoring against Värnamo in the 2017–18 Svenska Cupen. He scored his first goal of the 2018 Allsvenskan season on 7 July 2018 against GIF Sundsvall. He made his UEFA debut in the following match with a goal and an assist on 12 July in the 2018–19 UEFA Europa League. He scored another goal in the next round of the Europa League for a 1–1 draw against German Bundesliga side RB Leipzig.

Irandust scored his first goal of the 2019 Allsvenskan season in their opening match against Malmö FF and provided an assist to Alexander Faltsetas in the Swedish Cup final to qualify Häcken for the 2019–20 UEFA Europa League.

He scored his first goal of the 2020 Allsvenskan season in their opening match against Falkenberg before scoring from his own half a week later against IK Sirius. His first goal of the 2021 Allsvenskan season was scored on 18 July 2021 for a 1–0 win against IFK Norrköping at the Nya Parken.

Groningen
On 31 August 2021, Irandust joined Dutch Eredivisie side FC Groningen, receiving the number 10 jersey after Arjen Robben on a five-year deal for an approximately SEK 3 million transfer fee. He made his club debut on 12 September 2021 during the 2021–22 season in an Eredivisie match against Heerenveen at the Euroborg. He scored his first goal for the club and provided an assist to Romano Postema on 27 October 2021 in a KNVB Cup match against Helmond Sport. Irandust scored his first Eredivisie goal and provided an assist to Jørgen Strand Larsen on 27 November 2021 in a league match against Fortuna Sittard.

International career

Youth
Irandust has played for the Sweden U19 national team. Due to his Kurdish-Iranian heritage, Irandust is eligible to play for either Sweden or Iran. In June 2017, Irandust reaffirmed his decision to represent Sweden over Iran. He was called into the Sweden U21 team on 27 August 2017 for the 2019 UEFA European Under-21 Championship qualification. Irandust made his debut for the under-21s on 7 June 2018 with an assist to Carlos Strandberg in a 4–0 win over Malta. He was called into the under-21 squad in August 2019 for the start of their 2021 UEFA European Under-21 Championship qualification campaign. He provided assists to Pontus Almqvist and Gustav Henriksson in September 2020 during a 3–0 win over Italy.

Senior
Irandust was called into the senior national team by manager Janne Andersson on 3 December 2018 for their January 2019 friendly matches against Finland and Iceland. He made his international debut for Sweden on 8 January 2019 against Finland.

Style of play
Irandust has been praised for his creativity and sharp left foot.

Outside football

Personal life
Daleho Irandust was born and raised in Gothenburg to Kurdish-Iranian parents.

Sponsorship
Irandust is outfitted by American sportswear manufacturer Nike.

Career statistics

Club

International

Honours 
BK Häcken
Gothia Cup: 2016
Svenska Cupen: 2018–19

References

External links 
  (archive)
 
 

1998 births
Living people
Swedish people of Iranian descent
Swedish people of Kurdish descent
Kurdish sportspeople
Sportspeople of Iranian descent
Footballers from Gothenburg
Swedish footballers
Iranian footballers
Association football midfielders
Sweden international footballers
Sweden youth international footballers
Sweden under-21 international footballers
Allsvenskan players
Eredivisie players
BK Häcken players
FC Groningen players
Swedish expatriate footballers
Swedish expatriate sportspeople in the Netherlands
Expatriate footballers in the Netherlands